Collective leadership, or collectivity of leadership, was considered the ideal form of governance in the Union of Soviet Socialist Republics (USSR) and other socialist states espousing communism. Its main task was to distribute powers and functions among the Politburo and the Central Committee of the Communist Party of the Soviet Union, as well as the Council of Ministers, to hinder any attempts to create a one-man dominance over the Soviet political system by a Soviet leader, such as that seen under Joseph Stalin's rule. On the national level, the heart of the collective leadership was officially the Central Committee of the Communist Party. Collective leadership was characterised by limiting the powers of the General Secretary and the Chairman of the Council of Ministers as related to other offices by enhancing the powers of collective bodies, such as the Politburo.

Collective leadership was introduced following Stalin's death in 1953 and subsequent party leaders ruled as part of a collective. First Secretary Nikita Khrushchev criticized Stalin's dictatorial rule at the 20th Party Congress, but his increasingly erratic decisions lead to his ouster in 1964. He was replaced in his posts by Leonid Brezhnev as First Secretary and by Alexei Kosygin as Premier. Though Brezhnev gained more and more prominence over his colleagues, he retained the Politburo's support by consulting its members on all policies. Collective leadership was maintained under Yuri Andropov and Konstantin Chernenko. Mikhail Gorbachev's reforms espoused open discussion, leading to members of the leadership openly disagreeing on how little or how much reform was needed to rejuvenate the Soviet system.

History

Early years

Soviet ideologists believed that Lenin, the first Soviet leader, thought that only collective leadership could protect the Party from serious mistakes. Joseph Stalin, who consolidated his power after Lenin's death in 1924, promoted these values; however, instead of creating a new collective leadership, he built up a leadership centered around himself. After Stalin's death (5 March 1953), his successors, while vying for control over the Soviet leadership, promoted the values of collective leadership. Georgy Malenkov, Lavrentiy Beria and Vyacheslav Molotov formed a collective leadership immediately after Stalin's death, but it collapsed when Malenkov and Molotov turned on Beria. After the arrest of Beria (26 June 1953), Nikita Khrushchev proclaimed  collective leadership as the "supreme principle of our Party". He further stated that only decisions approved by the Central Committee (CC) could ensure good leadership for the party and the country. Khrushchev used these ideas so that he could win enough support to remove his opponents from power, most notably Premier Malenkov, who resigned in February 1955.

During the 20th Congress of the Communist Party of the Soviet Union Khrushchev criticised Stalin's rule and his "cult of personality". He accused Stalin of reducing the Party's activities and putting an end to Party democracy among others. In the three years following Stalin's death, the Central Committee and the Presidium (Politburo) worked consistently to uphold the collective leadership lost under Stalin. Khrushchev's rule as First Secretary remained highly controversial throughout his rule in the Party leadership. The first attempt to depose Khrushchev came in 1957, when the so-called Anti-Party Group accused him of individualistic leadership. The coup failed, but Khrushchev's position weakened drastically. However, Khrushchev continued to portray his regime as a "rule of the collective" even after becoming Chairman of the Council of Ministers (Premier), replacing Nikolai Bulganin.

Collectivity of leadership

Most Western observers believed that Khrushchev had become the supreme leader of the Soviet Union by the early 1960s, even if this was far from the truth. The Presidium, which had grown to resent Khrushchev's leadership style and feared Mao Zedong's one-man dominance and the growing cult of personality in the People's Republic of China, began an aggressive campaign against Khrushchev in 1963. This campaign culminated in 1964 with the replacement of Khrushchev in his offices of First Secretary by Leonid Brezhnev and of Chairman of the Council of Ministers by Alexei Kosygin. Brezhnev and Kosygin, along with Mikhail Suslov, Andrei Kirilenko and Anastas Mikoyan (replaced in 1965 by Nikolai Podgorny), were elected to their respective offices to form and lead a functioning collective leadership. One of the reasons for Khrushchev's ousting, as Suslov told him, was his violation of collective leadership. With Khrushchev's removal, collective leadership was again praised by the Soviet media as a return to "Leninist norms of Party life". At the plenum which ousted Khrushchev, the Central Committee forbade any single individual to hold the office of General Secretary and Premier simultaneously.

The leadership was usually referred to as the "Brezhnev–Kosygin" leadership, instead of the collective leadership, by First World medias. At first, there was no clear leader of the collective leadership, and Kosygin was the chief economic administrator, whereas Brezhnev was primarily responsible for the day-to-day management of the party and internal affairs. Kosygin's position was later weakened when he introduced a reform in 1965 that attempted to decentralise the Soviet economy. The reform led to a backlash, with Kosygin losing supporters because many top officials took an increasingly anti-reformist stance due to the Prague Spring of 1968. As the years passed, Brezhnev was given more and more prominence, and by the 1970s he had even created a "Secretariat of the General Secretary" to strengthen his position within the Party. At the 25th Party Congress, Brezhnev was, according to an anonymous historian, praised in a way that exceeded the praise accorded to Khrushchev before his removal. Brezhnev was able to retain the Politburo's support by not introducing the same sweeping reform measures as seen during Khrushchev's rule. As noted by foreign officials, Brezhnev felt obliged to discuss unanticipated proposals with the Politburo before responding to them.

Later years
As Brezhnev's health worsened during the late 1970s, the collective leadership became even more collective. Brezhnev's death did not alter the balance of power in any radical fashion, and Yuri Andropov and Konstantin Chernenko were obliged by protocol to rule the country in the very same fashion as Brezhnev. When Mikhail Gorbachev was elected to the position of General Secretary in March 1985, some observers wondered if he could be the leader to overcome the restraints of the collective leadership. Gorbachev's reform agenda had succeeded in altering the Soviet political system for good; however, this change made him some enemies. Many of Gorbachev's closest allies disagreed with him on what reforms were needed, or how radical they should be.

Analysis

Soviet assessments
According to Soviet literature, the Central Committee and not the Politburo was the heart of collective leadership at the national level. At a sub-national level, all Party and Government organs were to work together to ensure collective leadership instead of only the Central Committee. However, as with many other ideological theses, the definition of collective leadership was applied "flexibly to a variety of situations". Making Lenin the example of a ruler ruling in favour of a collective can be seen as proof of this "flexibility". In some Soviet ideological drafts, collective leadership can be compared to collegial leadership instead of a leadership of the collective. In accordance with a Soviet textbook, collective leadership was:

In contrast to fascism, which advocates one-man dominance, Leninism advocates inner-Party democratic collective leadership. Hence, the ideological justification of collective leadership in the Soviet Union was easy to justify. The physical insecurity of the political leadership under Stalin, and the political insecurity that existed during Khrushchev's reign, strengthened the political leadership's will to ensure a rule of the collective, and not that of the individual. Collective leadership was a value that was highly esteemed during Stalin and Khrushchev's reigns, but it was violated in practice.

Outside observers

Richard Löwenthal, a German professor, believed that the Soviet Union had evolved from being a totalitarian state under the rule of Joseph Stalin into a system that he called "post-totalitarian authoritarianism", or "authoritarian bureaucratic oligarchy", in which the Soviet state remained omnipotent in theory and highly authoritarian in practice. However, it did considerably reduce the scale of repression and allowed a much greater level of pluralism into public life. In a 1960 paper, Löwenthal wrote that one-man leadership was "the normal rule of line in a one-party state". The majority of First World observers tended to agree with Löwenthal on the grounds that a collective leadership in an authoritarian state was "inherently unworkable" in practice, claiming that a collective leadership would sooner or later always give in for one-man rule. In a different interpretation, the Soviet Union was seen to go into periods of "oligarchy" and "limited-personal rule". Oligarchy, in the sense that no individual could "prevent the adoption of policies in which he may be opposed", was seen as an unstable form of government. "Limited-personal rule", in contrast with Joseph Stalin's "personal rule", was a type of governance in which major policy-making decision could not be made without the consent of the leader, while the leader had to tolerate some opposition to his policies and to his leadership in general.

The historian T. H. Rigby claimed that the Soviet leadership was setting up checks and balances within the Party to ensure the stability of collective leadership. One anonymous historian went so far as to claim that collective leadership was bound to triumph in any future Soviet political system. Professor Jerome Gilison argued that collective leadership had become the "normal" ruling pattern of the Soviet Union. He argued that the Party had successfully set up checks and balances to ensure the continuity of the Soviet leadership. Khrushchev's rule was, according to Gilison, proof that the one-man dominance in Soviet politics had ended. As he noted, Khrushchev "was forced to retreat from unceremoniously from previously stated positions". The "grey men" of the party bureaucracy, Gilison believed, were to become the future Soviet leaders. Dennis Ross, an American diplomat, believed the late Brezhnev-era leadership had evolved into a "rule by committee", pointing to several collective Politburo decisions as evidence. Grey Hodnett, another analyst, believed that "freer communication" and "access to relevant official information" during the Brezhnev Era had contributed to strengthening the Politburo's collective leadership.

According to Thomas A. Baylis, the author of Governing by Committee: Collegial Leadership in Advanced Societies, the existence of collective leadership was due to the individual Politburo members enhancing their own positions by strengthening the collective. Ellen Jones, an educator, noted how each Politburo member specialised in his own field and acted as that field's spokesman in the Politburo. Therefore, collective leadership was divided into Party and Government institutional and organisational lines. The dominant faction, Jones believed, acted as a "coalition" government of several social forces. This development led some to believe that the Soviet Union had evolved into neo-corporatism. Some believed Soviet factionalism to be "feudal in character". Personal relationship were created to ensure service and support. "Personal factionalism", as Baylis calls it, could either strengthen or weaken the collective leadership's majority.

Robert Osborn wrote in 1974 that collective leadership did not necessarily mean that the Central Committee, Politburo and the Council of Ministers were political equals without a clear leading figure. Baylis believed that the post of General Secretary could be compared to the office of prime minister in the Westminster system. The General Secretary in the Soviet political system acted as the leading broker in Politburo sessions and could be considered "the Party leader" due to his negotiation skills and successful tactics which retained the Politburo's support. In other words, the General Secretary needed to retain Politburo consensus if he wanted to remain in office.

Notes

Sources
 
 
 
 
 

Leninism
Politics of the Soviet Union
Collective leadership